Closer Than Together is the tenth studio album by American folk rock band the Avett Brothers. The album was released on October 4, 2019, by American Recordings and Republic Records.

Critical reception

Closer Than Together received generally mixed reviews from critics. At Metacritic, which assigns a normalized rating out of 100 to reviews from critics, the album received an average score of 52, which indicates "mixed or average reviews", based on 4 reviews.

Track listing

Charts

References

2019 albums
The Avett Brothers albums
Republic Records albums
Albums produced by Rick Rubin